The Grafenort concentration campas treated in the present articleis a conventional name for three separate Nazi concentration camps that functioned in the village of Grafenort on the territory of Nazi Germany during the Second World War.
 The first of them (not in chronological order) is the all-female Arbeitslager or slave-labour that functioned only in 1945 as a subcamp of Gross-Rosen, whose detainees were exclusively Jewish women deported from Poland (regardless of nationality).
 The second is

Overview 
Located in an expropriated Renaissance castle, the concentration camp was operational throughout the War, but for 68 days (2 months and a week) was formally run as an all-female subcamp (Frauenarbeitslager) of Gross-Rosen between 1 March 1945 and 8 May 1945 (the latter being the date of its liberation by the Soviets) in the aftermath of the strategic liquidation of the Mit­tel­steine concentration camp in the latter weeks of the Wara move which the Nazis initiated owing to the advancing Eastern Front. In the course of liquidating Mittel­steine, the Nazis transferred between 250 and 300 female prisoners from Mittelsteine to Grafenort. Some sources put the documented number of prisoners evacuated from Mittelsteine to Grafenort in April 1945 at 400. All of the prisoners in the transfer were women of Jewish ethnicity originally deported from the region of Łódź. The distance between the Mittelsteine and Grafenort concentration camps is about 21 kilometres (13 miles) as the crow flies or 28 km (17 mi) by road. The reasons behind the liquidation of the Mittelsteine concentration camp and the transfer of its inmates to two other campsone of them being Grafenorthave not been fully understood by historians. (See also the history of the Mittelsteine concentration camp.)

The Grafenort concentration camp was one of the Krkonoše group of thirteen subcamps of Gross-Rosen located in the Riesengebirgethe so-called Riese groupwhich were concentrated primarily in the region of the Owl Mountains. The group of camps held collectively over 13,000 prisoners of whom approximately 40 percent perished from hunger and exhaustion brought about by slave labour.

Location 
The camp was situated in the locality called since the latter part of the 17th century Grafenort (renamed Gorzanów after 1945) in what was at the time of the camp's existence the territory of the Third Reich, about 10½ kilometres to the north of Bystrzyca Kłodzka (Ger., Habelschwerdt), the nearest larger townwithin the region of Lower Silesia that was awarded to Poland after the War.

The regional metropolis of Wrocław (Ger., Breslau) is 103 kilometres (64 miles) to the north-east, while Prague in the Czech Republic is 203 km (126 mi) away in the opposite direction.

The camp 
The camp was located on the premises of Grafenort Castle (Schloß Grafenort) in the village of Grafenort. Grafenort Castle had been used for the quartering of military gar­ri­sons (as large as 200 strong) in earlier times. Some works of reference indicate simply a preexisting "masonry building" (mu­ro­wa­ny bu­dy­nek) lying on the periphery of the village as the site of the camp. Sara Zyskind, a survivor, recalls that the truck in which the female prisoners were deported from Mittel­steine to Grafen­ort pulled up in front of one of the mansions of which the village of Grafenort was full, but one "much larger than the others and situated somewhat apart"which is consistent with the description of Grafenort Castle. Another famous survivor, Sara Selver-Urbach, writes about the prisoners' delusions indulged in for the sake of mutual moral support and survival:Already in Mittelsteine, we heard about the princely palaces in which we would be housed [at the new camp in Grafenort  explanation added], about the regal, mag­nif­i­cent beds that would be ours, about the gold plate off which we would be served meat and every other delicacy. Scornfully, we'd tell each other those tales with cynical disbelief.But the joke was of another kind altogether. The old building of the new camp had indeed been a regal palace previously, but its looks and accommodations have been transformed thoroughly for the purpose of housing us. The first impression was a shock: all the windows were boarded and barred with barbed wire, ex­act­ly like the Gypsy compound adjoining the Lodz Ghetto. Our second impression, when we entered the "Palatial Hall", was even more horrifying: the place was not divided into "rooms" and contained no bunks whatsoever, not even our former tiered shelves. All the inmates lay sprawled on the floor, all of them together in that one single hall which, to us, looked suddenly like a morgue, filthy blankets, bulging pallets almost glued to one another all over the floor.However, the physical description of the camp in the report of Ruth Minsky Sender, another survivor, differs markedly, suggesting more than one facility associated with the Grafenort concentration camp. Sender, in her book The Cage, speaks about "many barracks spread about a large field" with "rows and rows of wooden bunks reach[ing] to the ceiling". Clearly, the Grafenort concentration camp consisted of at least two parts where the prisoners were held.

The slave labour consisted in building fortifications (anti-tank trenches) against the advancing Eastern Front of the Allies, and the camp was perhaps the most notorious among all Nazi female concentration camps for the brutality of the treatment of prisoners.  Bella Gutterman, the director of the International Institute for Holocaust Research, singles out Grafenort as the only camp where women prisoners were employed exactly like men in gruelling excavation work.

Liberation 
The Grafenort concentration camp was liberated, according to best sources, on 8 May 1945.  Some sources indicate the date of the liberation of the camp as 7 May 1945 or 9 May 1945. According to the information collected by the Holocaust Education & Archive Research Team and other researchers, no Gross-Rosen subcamp was liberated on 7 Mayall of the Gross-Rosen subcamps were liberated between 8 and 9 May 1945.
The first Soviet soldier to enter Grafenort, a Russian Jew, was overcome with emotion when he realized that there were still some survivors left at the camp.

Notable inmates 
 Ruth Minsky Sender, writer

Bibliography 
 Obozy hitlerowskie na ziemiach polskich 19391945: informator encyklopedyczny, ed. Cz. Pilichowski, et al. (for the Główna Komisja Badania Zbrodni Hitlerowskich w Polsce and the Rada Ochrony Pomników Walki i Męczeństwa), Warsaw, Państwowe Wydawnictwo Naukowe, 1979, p. 509.  .
 Alfred Konieczny, Kobiety w obozie koncentracyjnym Gross-Rosen w latach 19441945, Wrocław, Zakład Narodowy im. Ossolińskich, 1982.
 Roman Mogilanski, comp. & ed., The Ghetto Anthology: A Comprehensive Chronicle of the Extermination of Jewry in Nazi Death Camps and Ghettos in Poland, rev. B. Grey, Los Angeles, American Congress of Jews from Poland and Survivors of Concentration Camps, 1985, page 246.
 Zygmunt Zonik, Anus belli: ewakuacja i wyzwolenie hitlerowskich obozów koncentracyjnych, Warsaw, Państwowe Wydawnictwo Naukowe, 1988. . (Inconceivably, the Grafenort concentration camp is misnamed "Grafendorf [sic!]" in this source.)
 Encyclopedia of the Holocaust, ed. I. Gutman, vol. 1, New York, Macmillan Publishing Company, 1995, pages 624625. . OK
 Enzyklopädie des Holocaust: die Verfolgung und Ermordung der europäischen Juden, ed. E. Jäckel, et al., vol. 1, Berlin, Argon, 1993, page 571. , .
 Women in the Holocaust: A Collection of Testimonies, comp. & tr. J. Eibeshitz & A. Eilenberg-Eibeshitz, vol. 2, Brooklyn (New York), Re­mem­ber, 1994, pages 67, 204205. , .
 Alfred Konieczny, Frauen im Konzentrationslager Groß-Rosen in den Jahren 19441945, Wałbrzych, Państwowe Muzeum Gross-Rosen, 1994.
 Benjamin and Vladka Meed Registry of Jewish Holocaust Survivors, vol. 2, Washington, D.C., United States Holocaust Memorial Council in cooperation with the American Gathering of Jewish Holocaust Survivors, 1996, pages 267268. .
 Studia nad Faszyzmem i Zbrodniami Hitlerowskimi, ed. K. Jonca, vol. 22 (2136), Wrocław, Wydawnictwo Uniwersytetu Wrocławskiego, 1999, page 375. . ISSN 0239-6661, . (An extremely important source.)
 Edward Basałygo, 900 lat Jeleniej Góry: Tędy przeszła historia: Kalendarium wydarzeń w Kotlinie Jeleniogórskiej i jej okolicach, Jelenia Góra, 2010. (See online.)
 Andrzej Strzelecki, Deportacja Żydów z getta łódzkiego do KL Auschwitz i ich zagłada: opracowanie i wybór źródeł, ed. T. Świebocka, Oświęcim, Państwowe Muzeum Auschwitz-Birkenau, 2004. .
 Filie obozu koncentracyjnego Gross-Rosen: informator, Wałbrzych, Muzeum Gross-Rosen, 2008, pp. 35, and passim. . OK
 Der Ort des Terrors: Geschichte der national­sozialistischen Konzentrationslager, eds. W. Benz & B. Distel, et al., vol. 8 (RigaKaiserwald, Warschau, Vaivara, Kauen (Kaunas), Płaszów, Kulmhof/Chełmno, Bełżec, Sobibór, Treblinka), Munich, Beck, 2008, p. 324. . OK
 Bella Gutterman, A Narrow Bridge to Life: Jewish Forced Labor and Survival in the Gross-Rosen Camp System, 19401945, tr. IBRT, New York, Berghahn Books, 2008. , .
 The United States Holocaust Memorial Museum Encyclopedia of Camps and Ghettos, 1933–1945, ed. Geoffrey P. Megargee, vol. 1 (Early Camps, Youth Camps, and Concentration Camps and Subcamps under the SS-Business Administration Main Office (WVHA)), Bloomington (Indiana), Indiana University Press, in association with the United States Holocaust Memorial Museum, 2009, pages 700, 737738, 766. . OK

See also 

 Mittelsteine concentration camp
 Gross-Rosen concentration camp
 List of subcamps of Gross Rosen
 List of Nazi-German concentration camps
 History of children in the Holocaust

References 

1944 establishments in Germany
1945 disestablishments in Germany
Gross-Rosen concentration camp
Nazi concentration camps in Poland
Unfree labor during World War II
World War II museums in Poland
World War II sites in Poland